The 1905 Virginia gubernatorial election was held on November 7, 1905 to elect the governor of Virginia.

Results

References

1905
Virginia
gubernatorial
November 1905 events